Alex Jacques René Dupont (30 June 1954 – 1 August 2020) was a French professional football player and manager.

Playing career
Dupont played as a midfielder for Dunkerque and Hazebrouck.

Managerial career
He managed Dunkerque, Charleville, Boulogne, Gueugnon, with whom he won the Coupe de la Ligue in 2000, Sedan, Laval and Amiens. He replaced Gérald Baticle as manager of Brest in 2009.

On 26 April 2012, he was sacked as Brest manager after just five games before the end of the season, bringing in Corentin Martins as interim manager.

On 22 June 2012, Dupont was named as head coach of Ligue 1 side Ajaccio. He was sacked on 17 December 2012.

He returned to manage Brest in 2013. At the end of the 2015–16 Ligue 2 season, the club did not renew his contract.

Death
Dupont died from cardiac arrest on 1 August 2020.

Honours
Gueugnon
Coupe de la Ligue: 1999–2000

Individual
Ligue 2 Manager of the Year: 2009–10

References

1954 births
2020 deaths
Sportspeople from Dunkirk
Association football midfielders
French footballers
French football managers
USL Dunkerque players
SC Hazebrouck players
Ligue 2 players
US Boulogne managers
FC Gueugnon managers
CS Sedan Ardennes managers
Stade Lavallois managers
Stade Brestois 29 managers
AC Ajaccio managers
Ligue 1 managers
Ligue 2 managers
Amiens SC managers
OFC Charleville managers
USL Dunkerque managers
Footballers from Hauts-de-France
French expatriate sportspeople in Qatar
French expatriate sportspeople in the United Arab Emirates